Axel Aage Kristensen (21 June 1873 – 23 November 1952) was a Danish sports shooter. He competed in five events at the 1900 Summer Olympics.

References

External links
 

1873 births
1952 deaths
Danish male sport shooters
Olympic shooters of Denmark
Shooters at the 1900 Summer Olympics
Sportspeople from Frederiksberg
Place of death missing